Xenophthalmidae is a family of crustaceans belonging to the order Decapoda.

Genera

The family has three genera in two subfamilies:

 Subfamily Anomalifrontinae Rathbun, 1931
 Anomalifrons Rathbun, 1931
Subfamily Xenophthalminae Stimpson, 1858
 Neoxenophthalmus Serène & Umali, 1972
 Xenophthalmus White, 1846

References

Decapods
Decapod families